NRY may refer to:
 Non-recombining Region of the Y chromosome
North Riding of Yorkshire (Chapman code)